Blake John Miguez (born November 1981) is a Republican member of the Louisiana House of Representatives from Iberia and Vermilion parishes. He won a special election against John Robert Bering on February 21, 2015, to succeed Simone B. Champagne, who resigned to become the chief administrative officer for the city of Youngsville in Lafayette Parish.     
 
Miguez is a competitive shooter, a grand master of the United States Practical Shooting Association. He has competed in the first season of the History Channel's marksmen competition Top Shot.

Biography
He is graduate of Catholic High School of New Iberia, Louisiana State University and Southern University Law School.

Miguez resides in New Iberia, Louisiana. He is an Executive in the Oil & Gas industry and a corporate attorney licensed in the State of Louisiana.

Miguez started shooting with his father at a local range at an early age. He started at USPSA and the International Practical Shooting Confederation when he was twelve years old. He started practicing with a Beretta 92F and became a Grand Master at the age of seventeen.

In 2010, in Top Shot competition, Miguez competed as part of the Blue Team. His team ended up winning six challenges. He was never nominated for elimination during that period. He was eliminated during the first week of the final half of the competition.

During one episode of the second season of the show, Miguez appeared with J.J. Racaza as trainers for one of the challenges.

In 2011, Miguez won his fourth consecutive title at the USPSA Area 4 Handgun Championship, and his seventh title in that tournament since 2003.

In 2013, Miguez appeared on Top Shot (season 5).

References

External links
Blake Miguez Bio on History Channel
 

|-

1981 births
21st-century American politicians
American male sport shooters
Businesspeople from Louisiana
Hispanic and Latino American state legislators
IPSC shooters
Living people
Republican Party members of the Louisiana House of Representatives
People from Lafayette, Louisiana
People from New Iberia, Louisiana